Eileen Cowin (born 1947) is a Los Angeles-based artist known for photography, video and mixed-media installations that draw on the language of mass media and art history and explore the relationship between narrative, fiction and non-fiction, memory and experience. Associated with the 1970s Los Angeles experimental photography scene and the Pictures Generation artists, her work combines familiar human situations and carefully chosen gestures, expressions and props to create enigmatic images whose implied, open-ended stories viewers must complete. Cowin has exhibited in more than forty solo shows in the United States and abroad, including at the Los Angeles County Museum of Art (LACMA), Museum of Contemporary Photography, Armory Center for the Arts and Contemporary Arts Center. Her work is included in more than forty institutional collections, including LACMA, the J. Paul Getty Museum, Brooklyn Museum, Art Institute of Chicago, San Francisco Museum of Modern Art (SFMOMA), and Smithsonian American Art Museum. She has been recognized with awards and commissions from the National Endowment for the Arts, LACMA, the City of Los Angeles (COLA), Public Art Fund (New York), and the Sundance and USA film festivals. New York Times critic Andy Grundberg wrote that her multi-image work "sets up a tension between the familiar and the mysterious, creating a climate of implied danger, sexual intrigue and violence" in which clues abound to intimate various narratives. Jody Zellen observed that Cowin "manipulates the conventions of photography, film, and video to tell a different kind of story—one that explores where truth and fiction merge, yet presents no conclusions. Cowin's work provokes."

Life and career
Cowin was born in Brooklyn, New York and attended State University of New York at New Paltz (BS, 1968), where artist and professor Robert Schuler was a key influence. She continued her studies at IIT Institute of Design in Chicago, (MS, Photography, 1970) with modernist photographers Aaron Siskind and Arthur Siegel. Cowin exhibited during and just after graduate school, including group shows at the Museum of Modern Art, Philadelphia Museum of Art and Fogg Museum, and a solo exhibition at the Witkin Gallery in New York (1972). From 1971–5, she taught photography at Franconia College in New Hampshire, before becoming a professor at California State University, Fullerton in 1975, where she taught until retiring in 2008.

Cowin's work quickly became associated with key postmodern and feminist currents, drawing attention on both coasts. She had notable solo exhibitions at LACMA (1985), Museum of Contemporary Photography (1991), Cleveland Museum of Art (1998), a traveling retrospective at the Amory Center for the Arts and Contemporary Arts Center in Cincinnati (2000), and gallery shows at OK Harris and Jayne H. Baum (New York City) and Roy Boyd Gallery (Santa Monica), among others. Her work was also included in the Whitney Biennial (1983), the traveling exhibitions "Photography in California, 1945 – 1980" (SFMOMA, 1984–6) and "Defining Eye: Women Photographers of the Twentieth Century" (Saint Louis Art Museum, 1997), the three-person exhibition, "Narrative Interventions in Photography" (Getty Museum, 2011), and the survey, "Under the Big Black Sun: California Art 1974-81" (Museum of Contemporary Art, Los Angeles, 2011).

Work
Cowin's work has been associated with two emerging movements of the 1970s: the Los Angeles experimental photography scene (which also included John Divola, Robert Heinecken and Darryl Curran) and the East Coast Pictures Generation artists. Cowin, and others such as James Casebere, Cindy Sherman, Laurie Simmons and Jeff Wall, challenged the realist, documentary aesthetic of preceding photographers with explicitly fabricated images that partook in artifice and the boundlessness associated with painting and cinema; critics suggest their work influenced the later generation of mise-en-scène photographers. While exploring media and formats from staged tableaux to multi-image, multimedia installations, Cowin's work retains a strategic and thematic consistency, combining objects, gestures, expressions, words and visual referents whose charged associations probe romantic, familial and social relationships, and themes involving public and private, truth and fiction, and the gulf between representation, the inexpressible and interpretation.

Early work: 1969–1979
In her early career, Cowin pushed against photographic conventions, incorporating appropriated imagery and unusual techniques into her images. She frequently layered transparencies of her own photographs—often of domestic subjects—with war and news images from magazines or sewed seemingly unrelated images onto print surfaces, reflecting feminist concerns. Her gum bichromate prints (1972–5) featured pale, washed-out colors that played against sensual, erotic imagery evoking the sexual liberation of the era; she multiplied the perspectives and readings of each work with layered personal symbols, cultural motifs and sewn elements.

Her One Night Stand suite (1977-9) anticipated the conceptual and narrative concerns, formal rigor and emotional depth of her mature work. Shot in the flat, unaffected tones and color of the day's minimalist and non-theatrical aesthetic, these playfully sparse compositions offered fragmented clues intimating a sexual tryst: Polaroid snapshots of people disrobing tucked behind phone cords and alarm clocks, rumpled sheets, nightstands. Absence was a key theme, with the Polaroids and nightstands—both humble holders of mundane personal effects and silent witnesses to life's most intimate moments—standing in for protagonists. Her concurrent "Lady Killer" series similarly explored absence but featured a more direct, aggressive tone and aesthetic.

Photography and installations: 1980s & 1990s
In the 1980s, Cowin continued to blur fiction and non-fiction in more fully constructed, cinematic scenes—an approach now sometimes called mise-en-scène photography—taking on a directorial mode that included storyboarding, scripting, staging actors, set design and framing. Carefully controlling eye contact, the direction of gazes, gesture, expression and props, she clustered her "sets" with charged symbols and elements in order to create multiple, contradictory readings, while alluding to timeless themes such as romance, abandonment, danger, corruption, and salvation.

Her widely recognized Family Docudrama series (1980–3) featured consciously staged domestic moments that critics situated in a liminal space between soap opera and conceptual art. Shot in Cowin's home and cast with herself and family members including her twin sister, these tableaux evoked familial intimacy and tension (marital, parental, sibling and professional), as well as a sense of artifice that subtly undermined the illusion of spontaneous documentary. In several works, Cowin used doubling devices—black-and-white background images and her twin—to suggest memory, history, a ghostly or other self, and the challenges of female identity from multiple vantage points. The series' images function as stand-alone multi-layered works, and collectively, as commentary on contemporary American family life, the web of social construction, and the media's blurring of public and the private, which can distort personal moments into pathologically self-conscious "performances."

In the latter 1980s, Cowin shifted toward more broadly resonant, sparsely staged images that The New York Times compared to the stylized theater work of Robert Wilson and Peter Sellars. Working with models and archetypal, symbolic gestures emerging from inky, black backgrounds, she drew, alternately, on the language of film noir (men in trench coats, women in slinky red dresses, billowing curtains, shadowed backgrounds) and Renaissance tableau vivant paintings. The film noir-ish images evoke elliptical narratives and themes of sexual tension, voyeurism, and rituals of male bonding and competition. Works such as Magritte and Mirror of Venus (1988) invoke and challenge art historical conventions such as the objectification of women or religious narratives, eschewing elaborate sets and period costumes for subtle expressions, dramatic gestures, and recognizable poses.

In the 1990s, Cowin began creating multiple-image works and installations (often mixing photography and video stills) that suggested loose, non-chronological narratives based on the interrelationships of the images and their characters and props. This work included, among others, a 1990 public installation commissioned for New York's Penn Station; Lot’s Wife (1991), which redressed the Biblical story in film noir; the moody, six-image Based on a True Story (1993); and the ominous I’ll Give You Something to Cry About (1996), which distills the passion and dissolution of an actual or conjectured union (including the hint of domestic violence) down to a small cluster of image/memories. Writers described the works' pared visuals as "almost calligraphic in their emotional intensity," noting how Cowin's use of alternating darkness and imagery evoked cinema, the guilty pleasure of voyeurism, memory and the unconscious.

Video, photography and public installations: 1996– 
In her later work, Cowin continues to consider the relationship of narrative, gesture, expression and symbolic objects to fact, fiction and truth, often with a greater emphasis on language and sociopolitical issues. The installation, I See What You're Saying (2002/2011), explored storytelling, truth and lying with images and diptychs that juxtapose altered books with close-ups of eyes and mouths—symbols of seeing and speaking—suggesting stories that migrate from the text to more ambiguous human gestures and expressions. Blow Me a Kiss (2013), one of two public, site-themed works at Los Angeles International Airport (LAX), comprised four video panels of faces blowing kisses that the Los Angeles Times called "hypnotic."

Much of Cowin's video work, beginning with It Goes Without Saying (1996) and It’s So Good to See You (1999), paradoxically constricts the medium's most useful storytelling device—motion—in favor of stillness, suggestion, and commonplace, intimate gesture and expression. I give you my word (Best Experimental Film Award, 2003 USA Film Festival), investigates memory and subjectivity with simultaneous split-screens of two people telling the story of the same event. The tightly composed, charged "Your Whole Body is a Target" (2006) explores the appropriation of gesture, self-preservation, fear and communal space, impressionistically depicting self-defense lessons that Cowin undertook in which she plays the roles of empowered and disempowered, assaulter and defender. The videos in her show, Do Nothing Until You Hear From Me (2018), offered ambiguous, suspenseful, and contradictory images that investigated the apprehension and construction of reality and sociopolitical issues such as immigration.

Cowin's 63-foot, photographic public mural, Shelf Life (2018, LAX), focused on objects, with a film-frame-like sequence of images of shelves containing carefully chosen books, photos and keepsakes; the interplay of text, titles and objects suggest narratives on contemporary social themes such as identity, citizenship, travel, place, and universal connection. Cowin's other commissioned public works include billboards for LACMA's "Made in California" show (2000) and MAK Center for Art and Architecture's "How Many Billboards?" show (2010).<ref name="LACMA00">Los Angeles County Museum of Art. [https://archive.org/stream/madeincaliforn00barr_/madeincaliforn00barr_djvu.txt Made in California: Art, Image, and Identity, 1900-2000"], Los Angeles: Los Angeles County Museum of Art, 2000. Retrieved June 27, 2019.</ref> an installation for Los Angeles MTA's inaugural Metro Rail Light Boxes project, (2001), and a 14-sequence installation for the system's Martin Luther King Jr. station (future).Los Angeles Metro. "I see what you’re saying (train of thought), 2001", Artworks. Retrieved June 27, 2019.

Recognition and collections
Cowin's work belongs to the permanent collections of more than 40 museums and institutions, including the LACMA,Muchnic, Suzanne. "Reaping the Rewards of 'Avarice'," Los Angeles Times, July 8, 1992. Retrieved June 27, 2019. the J. Paul Getty Museum, Brooklyn Museum, Art Institute of Chicago, SFMOMA, Smithsonian American Art Museum, Denver Art Museum, Hammer Museum, Museum of Contemporary Photography, Museum of Fine Arts, Houston, Museum of Modern Art, National Gallery of Canada, Seattle Art Museum and Tokyo Metropolitan Museum of Photography, as well as many private collections. Her work has been included in numerous art historical books,Hoy, Anne. Fabrications: Staged, Altered, and Appropriated Photographs, New York: Abbeville Press, 1987. Retrieved June 13, 2019. monographs,Muchnic, Suzanne. "American Photography as Seen From Japan : American Contemporary Photography," Los Angeles Times, December 20, 1987. Retrieved June 27, 2019. and catalogues, including The History of Photography: An Overview (1999), A History of Women in Photography (1994), and New American Photography'' (1985).

Cowin has received awards, grants and commissions from Los Angeles World Airports (2019–20, 2017–8, 2013), Metropolitan Transit Authority (Los Angeles, 2015–20), the City of Santa Monica (2014–5; 2012), California Community Foundation (2012), Center for Cultural Innovation (2011), Sundance Film Festival (2002), California Arts Council (2001), LACMA (2000), City of Los Angeles (1997), Art Matters (1994), Public Art Fund, New York (1990), and National Endowment for the Arts (1990, 1982, 1979, 1974), among others.

References

External links
Eileen Cowin official website
Eileen Cowin papers, 1961-2015, Smithsonian Archives of American Art
Eileen Cowin, Museum of Contemporary Photography profile
Eileen Cowin on her series I See What You're Saying
Eileen Cowin, I see what you’re saying (train of thought), 2001, LA Metro
Conversation with Eileen Cowin, The Getty

American women artists
21st-century American photographers
Photographers from New York City
American conceptual artists
State University of New York at New Paltz alumni
Illinois Institute of Technology alumni
People from Brooklyn
1947 births
Living people
21st-century American women photographers
21st-century American women